The Stockholm municipal election of 1985 was held on 15 September 1985 concurrently with the 1985 Swedish parliamentary election.  This election used a party-list proportional representation system to allocate the 101 seats of the Stockholm City Council (Stockholms stadsfullmäktige) amongst the various Swedish political parties.  Voter turnout was 85.2%.

The Swedish Centre Party received only 2.9% of the votes in this election, less than half of the 6.3% they received in 1982, and thus the Centre Party was not allocated any seats as a result of this election.  This marks their first failure to achieve a mandate since they first entered the Stockholm City Council in 1966.

Results

See also
 Elections in Sweden
 List of political parties in Sweden
 City of Stockholm

Notes

References
Statistics Sweden, "Kommunfullmäktigval - valresultat" (Swedish) 
Statistics Sweden, "Kommunfullmäktigval - erhållna mandat efter kommun och parti. Valår 1973–2006" (Swedish) 

Municipal elections in Stockholm
1985 elections in Sweden
1980s in Stockholm
September 1985 events in Europe